Bojan Zavišić (Serbian Cyrillic: Бојан Завишић; born 9 August 1979) is a Serbian former footballer.

Club career
Zavišić was promoted to the first team of Partizan in the 2002–03 campaign, previously playing for their satellite club Teleoptik. After winning the national championship in his first season with Partizan, Zavišić was also part of the squad that qualified for the group stage of the 2003–04 UEFA Champions League. In the 2004 winter transfer window, Zavišić was loaned to Sutjeska Nikšić until the end of the 2003–04 season. Zavišić also played with Banat Zrenjanin, Smederevo and Čukarički in the Serbian SuperLiga. Zavišić last played for Okzhetpes during the 2010 Kazakhstan Premier League.

Honours
Partizan
 First League of Serbia and Montenegro (1): 2002–03

Personal life
His father Ilija was also a Partizan player and youth system coach.

External links
 

1979 births
Living people
Footballers from Belgrade
Serbian footballers
Serbian expatriate footballers
Association football defenders
FK Teleoptik players
FK Partizan players
FK Sutjeska Nikšić players
FK Zeta players
FK Obilić players
FK Banat Zrenjanin players
FK Smederevo players
FK Čukarički players
Serbian SuperLiga players
FC Okzhetpes players
Expatriate footballers in Kazakhstan
Serbian expatriate sportspeople in Kazakhstan